State Highway 63 (Andhra Pradesh) is a state highway in the Indian state of Andhra Pradesh

Route 

It starts at Gudivada and passes through Mudinepalle and ends at Bhimavaram.

See also 
 List of State Highways in Andhra Pradesh

References 

State Highways in Andhra Pradesh
Roads in Krishna district
Roads in West Godavari district